Greatest Hits Volume One is a greatest hits album by Billy "Crash" Craddock. It was released in 1974 on ABC Records. It was produced by Ron Chancey.

Track listing 
"Knock Three Times"
"Dream Lover"
"Don't Be Angry"
"Slippin' and Slidin'"
"'Till The Water Stops Runnin'"
"Sweet Magnolia Blossom"
"You Better Move On"
"Afraid I'll Want To Love Her One More Time"
"I'm Gonna Knock On Your Door"
"Ain't Nothin' Shakin'"

See also
 Billy "Crash" Craddock discography

References

1974 greatest hits albums
Billy "Crash" Craddock compilation albums